Attilio Prior (18 October 1934 – 10 July 2021) was an Italian footballer who played as a midfielder.

Career 
Prior played in Serie B with Lanerossi Vicenza in 1953. He made his debut on 9 May 1954 against Calcio Como. The following season he appeared in five matches and assisted in securing the Serie B title.

In 1960, he played abroad in the National Soccer League with Toronto Italia. The signing of Prior was reflective of Italia's general manager Alan Astri's policy of foreign player recruitment. 

In the postseason match against Toronto Sparta he recorded goal to advance Italia to the NSL Championship finals. The team secured the NSL Championship after a series of matches against Montreal Cantalia. 

He died on 10 July 2021.

Honors  
Lanerossi Vicenza
 Serie B: 1954-1955

Toronto Italia 
 NSL Championship: 1960
 National Soccer League: 1960

References 
 

1934 births
2021 deaths
Association football midfielders
Italian footballers
L.R. Vicenza players
Toronto Italia players
Serie B players
Canadian National Soccer League players
People from Castelfranco Veneto
Sportspeople from the Province of Treviso
Footballers from Veneto